Antria Michail (born 19 December 1991) is a Cypriot footballer who plays as a midfielder for First Division club Lefkothea Latsion and the Cyprus women's national team.

Career
Michail has been capped for the Cyprus national team, appearing for the team during the UEFA Women's Euro 2021 qualifying cycle.

References

External links
 
 
 

1991 births
Living people
Cypriot women's footballers
Cyprus women's international footballers
Women's association football midfielders
Apollon Ladies F.C. players